Austin Tate  is Emeritus Professor of Knowledge-based systems in the School of Informatics at the University of Edinburgh.  From 1985 to 2019 he was Director of AIAI (Artificial Intelligence Applications Institute) in the School of Informatics at the University of Edinburgh.

He is known for his contributions to AI Planning, applications of Artificial Intelligence, and work on collaborative systems in Virtual Worlds.

Early life and education
Tate was born 12 May 1951, Knottingley, West Yorkshire, UK. He completed his  B.A. (Hons) Computer Studies, Lancaster University, 1969-1972. He completed his postgraduate study in Machine Intelligence at University of Edinburgh, supervised by Donald Michie, 1972-1975 and a Master of Science degree in e-Learning at the University of Edinburgh, 2011-2012.

Research and career
Tate's research interests are in Artificial intelligence.

Selected publications
 Tate, A. (1977) Generating Project Networks, Proceedings of the International Joint Conference on Artificial Intelligence (IJCAI-77), pp. 888–893, Cambridge, MA, USA, Morgan Kaufmann.
 
 Tate, A., Levine, J., Dalton, J. and Nixon, A. (2003) Task Achieving Agents on the World Wide Web, in "Spinning the Semantic Web" (Fensel, D., Hendler, J., Liebermann, H. and Wahlster, W.), Chapter 15, pp. 431–458, MIT Press, 2003.
 
 
 Other Publications: O-Plan Papers, I-X Papers

Honours and awards
Tate's awards and honours include:
 1993 – Elected AAAI Fellow
 1998 – Fellow of the Workflow Management Coalition (WfMC)
 1999 – Elected a Fellow of the Royal Society of Edinburgh (FRSE)
 1999 – Fellow of the European Association for Artificial Intelligence (EurAI)
 2000 – Fellow of the British Computer Society (FBCS)
 2006 – Fellow of the Society for the Study of Artificial Intelligence and the Simulation of Behaviour (SSAISB)
 2012 – Elected a Fellow of the Royal Academy of Engineering (FREng)

Personal life
He was married in 1975 to Margaret (née Mowbray) at Knottingley, West Yorkshire, England.

References

External links
 Research: AIAI Planning and Activity Management Group website
 AI Planners: Traverser, Interplan, Nonlin, O-Plan, I-X/I-Plan
 Example Projects: AKT (Advanced Knowledge Technologies), CoAX (Coalition Agents eXperiment), FireGrid, OpenKnowledge, I-Room, OpenVCE
 Virtual World Avatar: Ai Austin's website
 Interests: Austin Tate's Gerry Anderson Web Area, Supercar, Fireball XL5

1951 births
People from Knottingley
Living people
Artificial intelligence researchers
Alumni of Lancaster University
Alumni of the University of Edinburgh
Academics of the University of Edinburgh
Fellows of the Royal Academy of Engineering
Fellows of the Royal Society of Edinburgh
British computer scientists
Fellows of the British Computer Society
Fellows of the Association for the Advancement of Artificial Intelligence
Fellows of the SSAISB
Fellows of the European Association for Artificial Intelligence